The Jianghan Plain railway is a freight-only railway line in the Jianghan Plain, China.

History
The line opened on 21 December 2018.

Route
The line splits from the Changjiangbu–Jingmen railway east of Tianmen railway station. At Tianmen East railway station, the line splits. One branch heads west to Qianjiang North railway station, while the other heads east to Xiantao East railway station. The Xiantao branch will serve the currently under construction Xiantao Power Station.

References

Railway lines in China
Railway lines opened in 2018